Utricularia sect. Pleiochasia is a section in the genus Utricularia.

See also 
 List of Utricularia species

Utricularia
Plant sections